Chrysanthellum is a genus of flowering plants in the aster family.

Species
As of 1988;
 Chrysanthellum americanum (L.) Vatke - Central America, West Indies, Chiapas; naturalized in parts of Asia, Africa, South America
 Chrysanthellum filiforme McVaugh	- Michoacán
 Chrysanthellum indicum DC.
 Chrysanthellum integrifolium Steetz - Central America, southern Mexico
 Chrysanthellum involutum Paul G.Wilson	- Guerrero, México State
 Chrysanthellum keilii B.L.Turner - Michoacán
 Chrysanthellum michoacanum B.L.Turner - Michoacán
 Chrysanthellum perennans B.L.Turner	- Oaxaca
 Chrysanthellum pilzii Strother - Oaxaca
 Chrysanthellum pusillum Hook.f. - Galápagos
 Chrysanthellum tamaulipense B.L.Turner - Tamaulipas

Kew also accepts;
 Chrysanthellum fagerlindii Eliasson - Galápagos
 Chrysanthellum pinnatisectum  - Guerrero, Mexico
 Chrysanthellum rosei  - (Sinaloa, Durango), Mexico

References

Coreopsideae
Asteraceae genera